Jaesan-myeon (Hangeul: 재산면, Hanja:才山面) is a myeon or a township in Bonghwa county of North Gyeongsang province in South Korea. The total area of Jaesan-myeon is 126.01 square kilometers, and, as of 2006, the population was 1,692 people. Jaesan-myeon is further divided into five "ri", or small villages.

Administrative divisions
Hyeondong-ri (현동리)
Nammyeon-ri (남면리)
Dongmyeon-ri (동면리)
Galsan-ri (갈산리)
Sang-ri (상리)

Schools
Jaesan Elementary School(재산초등학교) in Hyeondong-ri.
Jaesan Middle School (재산중학교) in Hyeondong-ri.

Sources

External links
  Jaesan-myeon Office Homepage
 Tourist Map of Bonghwa county including Jaesan-myeon

Bonghwa County
Towns and townships in North Gyeongsang Province